Luzula piperi, commonly known as Piper's woodrush is a perennial species of plant in the genus Luzula of the (rush) family Juncaceae. Luzula piperi is native to northwestern North America and eastern Asia.

References

piperi
Flora of Western Canada
Flora of Alaska
Flora of the Western United States
Flora of Eastern Asia
Flora without expected TNC conservation status